Taki Ramakrishna Mission High School is a unit of Ramakrishna Mission Ashrama along with High School under the Mission. It is situated in Taki, North 24 Parganas district in the Indian state of West Bengal. It is affiliated to the West Bengal Council of Higher Secondary Education and West Bengal Board of Secondary Education. There is also one Primary School besides the High schools and center on a Hostel, where around 100 students can stay and pursue their schooling.

History
The Taki Ramkrishna Ashrama and the high school were established in 1931 and made a branch of the Mission in 1938. Presently the school is run under the guidance of Ramakrishna Mission at Belur Math.

References

Boarding schools in West Bengal
Schools affiliated with the Ramakrishna Mission
Educational institutions established in 1931
1931 establishments in India
Schools in Colonial India
Schools in North 24 Parganas district